The Jungfernhof concentration camp was an improvised concentration camp in Latvia, at the Mazjumprava Manor, near the Šķirotava Railway Station about three or four kilometers from Riga (now within the city territory). The camp was in operation from December 1941 through March 1942, and served as overflow housing for Jews from Germany and Austria, who had originally been intended for Minsk as a destination.

Improvised housing 

The new destination, the Riga Ghetto was also overcrowded and could not accommodate the Jewish people deported from Germany.  The first transport train with 1,053 Berlin Jews arrived at the Šķirotava Railway Station on 30 November 1941.  All persons on board were murdered later the same day at the Rumbula Forest near Riga. The next four transports were, on the orders of SS-Brigadeführer Franz Walter Stahlecker, commander of Einsatzgruppen A, brought to Greater Jungfernhof, an abandoned farming estate on the Daugava River.  Originally Jungfernhof was to have been established as an SS business enterprise, and being under the jurisdiction of the SS it could be employed without consulting with the German civil administration ("Gebietskommissariat") in Latvia.  Under the new plan, Jungfernhof would serve as improvised housing in order to make available labor for the construction of the Salaspils concentration camp.

Only the sixth transport, which arrived on 10 December 1941 with Cologne Jews on board, came to the "freed up" Riga ghetto, following the murder there of numerous Latvian Jews.

Operations 
The former estate of 200 hectares in size, had built on it a warehouse, three large barns, five small barracks and various cattle sheds.  The partially falling down and unheatable buildings were unsuitable for the accommodation of several thousand people.  There were no watchtowers or enclosing perimeter, rather a mobile patrol of ten to fifteen Latvian auxiliary police (Hilfspolizei) under the German commandant Rudolf Seck.

In December 1941 a total of 3,984 people were brought in four separate trains to Jungfernhof, including 136 children under ten years old, and 766 elders.  On 1 December 1941, 1,013 Jews from Württemberg were entrained and sent to the camp.  A further 964 were deported on 6 December 1941 from Hamburg, Lübeck (leaving only 90 Jews resident in the city, and others from throughout Schleswig-Holstein. Further transports came from Nuremberg with 1,008 persons and Vienna with 1,001.

History of the prisoners 

About 800 of the prisoners died in the winter of 1941 to 1942 of hunger, cold, typhus.  The testimony of an eyewitness, that there was a gas van assigned to the camp, is no longer believed and is treated as unsubstantiated.

In March 1942 the camp was dissolved. As part of the Dünamünde Action under the false representation that they would be taken to an (actually nonexisting) camp in Dünamunde, where there would be better conditions and work assignments in a canning plant, between 1600 and 1700 inmates were taken to Biķernieki forest. There they were shot on 26 March 1942 and interred in mass graves, as previously Jews from the Riga Ghetto had been. Among those shot was the camp elder Max Kleemann (b. 1887), a veteran of the Great War, who had been transported from Würzburg with his daughter Lore. Viktor Marx, from Württemberg, whose wife Marga and daughter Ruth were shot, reported:

Among the murdered inmates of the concentration camp were the older rabbis and prominent citizens of Lübeck, Felix F. Carlebach, his sister-in-law, Resi Carlebach (née Graupe), as well as his uncle, Joseph Carlebach (b. 1883) with his wife Charlotte (b. 1900 née Preuss), and their three youngest children, Ruth (b. 1926), Noemi (b. 1927) and Sara (b. 1928). They were shot on 26 March 1942 in Biķernieki forest. The banker Simson Carlebach (1875-1942), brother of rabbi Joseph Carlebach, had already died in the course of being transported to the camp.  The second oldest son of the nine children of Joseph Carlebach, Salomon (Shlomo Peter) Carlebach (b. 17 August 1925), survived because he had been included within a work commando. He later became a rabbi in New York. Salomon Carlebach reported in an interview on the moment that he saw his father for the last time:

On his personal story, Carlebach said "without a positive attitude no one had any chance of survival."

450 inmates were held back and formed into a work commando. They were intended to be used to disguise the camp remnants as a farm. This work commando existed for one year. The survivors were then sent to the Riga ghetto, which existed until November 1943.

Of the approximately 4,000 people transported to Jungfernhof, only 148 persons survived.

Notes

References 
  Josef Katz: Erinnerungen eines Überlebenden. Kiel 1988, .
  Interview mit dem überlebenden Salomon (Shlomo Peter) Carlebach (* 17. August 1925) in: Sabine Niemann (Redaktion): Die Carlebachs, eine Rabbinerfamilie aus Deutschland. Ephraim-Carlebach-Stiftung (Hrsg.), Dölling und Galitz, Hamburg 1995, .
  Miriam Gillis-Carlebach: "Licht in der Finsternis". Jüdische Lebensgestaltung im Konzentrationslager Jungfernhof. In: Gerhard Paul und Miriam Gillis-Carlebach: Menora und Hakenkreuz. Neumünster 1988, S. 549–563.
  Peter Guttkuhn: Die Lübecker Geschwister Grünfeldt. Vom Leben, Leiden und Sterben ‚nichtarischer' Christinnen. Schmidt-Römhild, Lübeck 2001, .
  Andrej Angrick, Peter Klein: Die "Endlösung" in Riga. Ausbeutung und Vernichtung 1941–1944. Darmstadt 2006, .

External links 
  Mazjumpravas muiža
  Transport nach Jungfernhof (Zeitzeugenbericht)
  Bernhard Kolb: die Juden in Nuernberg 1839-1945, 4.7 Die Evakuierungen 1940-1943 (Zeitzeugenbericht)

 
1941 in Latvia
Einsatzgruppen
Nazi concentration camps in Latvia
Jewish Latvian history
Generalbezirk Lettland